These are the international rankings of .

Economy

World Economic Forum 2016-2017 Global Competitiveness Report ranked 112 out of 138

Society

United Nations Development Programme 2015 Human Development Index ranked 170 out of 188

Politics

Transparency International 2015 Corruption Perceptions Index ranked  64 out of 168

References

Senegal